The demographics of Toronto, Ontario, Canada make Toronto one of the most multicultural and multiracial cities in the world. In 2021, 57.0 percent of the residents of the metropolitan area belonged to a visible minority group, compared with 51.4 percent in 2016, and 13.6 percent in 1981. Toronto also has established ethnic neighbourhoods such as the multiple Chinatowns, Corso Italia, Little Italy, Little India, Greektown, Koreatown, Little Jamaica, Little Portugal and Roncesvalles, which celebrate the city's multiculturalism. Data from the suburban municipalities are also included for some metrics as most of these municipalities are part of the Toronto CMA (not to be confused with the Greater Toronto Area).

Population 

The last complete census by Statistics Canada, which was taken in 2021, estimated there were 2,794,356 living in Toronto, making it the largest city in Canada and the fourth most populous municipality in North America.

Toronto's population grew by 2.3 percent from 2016 to 2021, with an annual growth rate of 0.46 percent.

2011 Census population data for the City of Toronto are found readily aggregated at a finer level than the city as a whole at i. the electoral district (riding) level (2003 redistribution) and ii. the neighbourhood level. The three ridings with the largest increase in population between 2006 and 2011 in the City of Toronto have been 
 Trinity-Spadina (25.5%),
 Etobicoke-Lakeshore (7.3%), and
 Toronto Centre (7.3%).

Age structure
As of 2016 census

Ethnic diversity

City of Toronto
 
The 2021 Census indicates that 55.7% of Toronto's population is composed of visible minorities, compared with 51.5% in 2016.

According to the 2021 Canadian census, 1,537,285 racialized people, or approximately 10.7 percent of Canada's visible minority population, live in the city of Toronto; of this, roughly 67 percent are of Asian ancestry. Annually, almost half of all immigrants to Canada settle in the Greater Toronto Area. A study released by the Toronto District School Board (TDSB) in December 2012 found that 66 percent of students ages 4 through 18 came from visible minorities. East Asians made up the largest ethnic group (33 percent), with South Asians (28 percent) coming in second of the city of Toronto's overall population.

Note: Totals greater than 100% due to multiple origin responses.

Change between 2011 and 2016:

Increase:
 Filipino: +20,270 (+0.6%)
 Black: +21,690 (+0.4%)
 Chinese: +21,070 (+0.3%)
 South Asian: +21,865 (+0.3%)
 Multiple visible minorities: +9,755 (+0.3%)
 Arab: +7,110 (+0.2%)
 Latin American: +5,955 (+0.1%)
 Korean: +4,415 (+0.1%)
 Aboriginal: +3,800 (+0.2%)
 Visible minority, n.i.e.: 3,305 (+0.1%)
 Japanese: +1,095 (-)

Decrease:
 White: -9,615 (-2.5%)
 Southeast Asian: -5,180 (-0.3%)

The most prevalent ethnic origins in the City of Toronto are as follows:

Community Councils 
The top visible-minority groups per Community Council (2016 Census)  are as follows:

 Toronto & East York (847,045): White: 65.3%, Chinese: 8.9%, South Asian: 6.7%, Black: 5.6%
 North York (638,100): White: 47.4%, Chinese: 14.0%, South Asian: 8.5%, Filipino: 8.0%, West Asian: 5.3%, Black: 5.2%
 Scarborough (623,135): White: 26.5%, South Asian: 25.4%, Chinese: 19.0%, Black: 10.8%, Filipino: 8.4%
 Etobicoke York (583,395): White: 48.9%, Black: 15.7%, South Asian: 11.9%, Latin American: 5.6%

The progression of the percentage of visible minorities in the aforementioned Community Councils (pre-1998-amalgamation municipalities or pairs thereof) has been far from uniform:

Ridings 
The finest granularity of visible minority data in Toronto readily available by the 2016 Census is that of the federal electoral district (riding; 2013 redistribution). The per-riding data based on the 2003 redistribution was available for the 2001 and 2006 censuses and the 2011 NHS, thus enabling useful comparisons. For instance, visible minorities as a percentage of the population only marginally increased, or even decreased (Toronto-Danforth, Parkdale-High Park, Toronto Centre, and, in the 2006–2011 period, Davenport) in the "Old" Toronto, East York and South Etobicoke ridings, while on the other hand increased significantly in Scarborough and North York. Since the 2016 Census used the then-new 2013 redistribution, such a direct comparison is no longer possible.

Concentrations of ethnic groups per City of Toronto ridings (2016 Census) are as follows, with the largest proportion of each group in bold. For each of the federal electoral districts in the City of Toronto, the ethnic groups with 5% of more of population are shown, in a rough correspondence with community councils and pre-amalgamation municipalities (highest percentage for each ethnic group as well the most populous ethnic group in a riding, if a visible minority – are shown in bold):

TORONTO & EAST YORK

NORTH YORK

SCARBOROUGH

ETOBICOKE & YORK
For each of the federal electoral districts in the City of Toronto, the ethnic origin groups with 7% of more of population are shown, in a rough correspondence with community councils and pre-amalgamation municipalities (highest % for each ethnic group as well the most populous ethnic group in a riding – if not Canadian or English, which are the most frequent ones - are shown in bold):

TORONTO & EAST YORK

NORTH YORK

SCARBOROUGH

ETOBICOKE & YORK

Wards 
Top ethnic origin per Toronto ward (as designated by the City of Toronto; 2011 Census data - total responses)
 English (18): Ward 32 - Beaches-East York (15.2%), Ward 13 - Parkdale-High Park (12.9%), Ward 22 - St. Paul's (12.9%), Ward 36 - Scarborough Southwest (12.8%), [...]
 Chinese (7): Ward 41 - Scarborough-Rouge Park (52.0%), Ward 39 - Scarborough-Agincourt (49.0%), Ward 24 - Willowdale (27.0%), Ward 40 - Scarborough-Agincourt (22.6%)
 East Indian (7): Ward 1 - Etobicoke North (23.4%), Ward 42 - Scarborough-Rouge Park (15.9%), Ward 38 - Scarborough Centre (13.1%), Ward 2 - Etobicoke North (11.8%)
 Italian (4): Ward 9 - York Centre (21.9%), Ward 12 - York South-Weston (15.1%), Ward 7 - York West (14.3%), Ward 4 - Etobicoke Centre (11.8%)
 Portuguese (2): Ward 17 - Davenport (19.7%), Ward 18 - Davenport (16.4%)
 Jewish (2): Ward 10 - York Centre (15.0%), Ward 21 - St. Paul's (10.6%)
 Filipino (2): Ward 15 - Eglinton-Lawrence (10.0%), Ward 35 - Scarborough Southwest (8.7%)
 Canadian (2): Ward 37 - Scarborough Centre (8.6%), Ward 11 - York South-Weston (7.4%)

Neighbourhoods 
Top ethnic origin per Toronto neighbourhood (as designated by the City of Toronto; 2006 Census data - total responses)
 English (59): Leaside-Bennington (40%), The Beaches (39%), Rosedale-Moore Park (36%), Kingsway South (35%), [...]
 Chinese (23): Steeles (70%), Milliken (65%), Agincourt North (56%), Agincourt South-Malvern West (47.1%), [...]
 Italian (15): Maple Leaf (45%), Humber Summit (34.5%), Pelmo Park-Humberlea (34.2%), Yorkdale-Glen Park (33.6%), [...]
 Indian (15): West Humber-Clairville (33%), Mount Olive-Silverstone-Jamestown (30%), Thorncliffe Park (24%), Woburn (22%), [...]
 Jewish (10): Forest Hill North (32%), Westminster-Branson (31%), Forest Hill South (29%), Bedford Park-Nortown (28%), [...]
 Portuguese (9): Little Portugal (38%), Caledonia-Fairbank (37%), Weston-Pellam Park (34%), Keelesdale-Eglinton West (32%), [...]
 Filipino (3): North St. James Town (17%), Ionview (16%), Kennedy Park (13%)
 Jamaican (3): Beechborough-Greenbrook (15%), Black Creek (10.0%), Mount Dennis (9.7%)
 Canadian (2): New Toronto (21%), Alderwood (19%)
 Greek (1): Broadview North (15%)

The neighbourhoods with the highest percentage of visible minorities (2016 data) are as follows:

 Milliken: 97% (top ethnic origin: Chinese)
 Steeles: 91% (top ethnic origin: Chinese)
 Agincourt North: 91% (top ethnic origin: Chinese)
 Malvern: 90% (top ethnic origin: East Indian)
 West Humber-Clairville: 87% (top ethnic origin: East Indian)
 Mount Olive-Silverstone-Jamestown: 87% (top ethnic origin: East Indian)
 Agincourt South-Malvern West: 86% (top ethnic origin: Chinese)
 Black Creek: 81% (top ethnic origin: Vietnamese)
 Rouge: 81% (top ethnic origin: East Indian)
 Flemingdon Park: 79% (top ethnic origin: East Indian)
 Thorncliffe Park: 79% (top ethnic origin: Pakistani)

Those with the lowest percentage of visible minorities (2016 data) are:

 Kingsway South: 12% (top ethnic origin: English)
 Markland Wood: 13% (top ethnic origin: English)
 The Beaches: 14% (top ethnic origin: English)
 Runnymede-Bloor West Village: 16% (top ethnic origin: English)
 Casa Loma: 17% (top ethnic origin: English)
 Forest Hill South: 17% (top ethnic origin: Polish)
 Lawrence Park South: 17% (top ethnic origin: English)
 Stonegate-Queensway: 18% (top ethnic origin: English)
 Leaside-Bennington: 18% (top ethnic origin: English)
 Rosedale-Moore Park: 18% (top ethnic origin: English)

Toronto CMA 

Note: Totals greater than 100% due to multiple origin responses.

The following are the twenty (20) more common ethnic origins in the Toronto CMA:

The top 20 ethnic origins in the Toronto CMA, from 1996 to 2016 are as follows:

Change between 2011 and 2016:

Largest increases:
 Chinese: +105,970 (+1.2%)
 East Indian: +71,120 (+0.6%)
 Pakistani: +32,340 (+0.5%)
 Filipino: +28,330 (+0.2%)
 Jamaican: +23,030 (+0.2%)
 Polish: +22,785 (+0.1%)
 Russian: +21,820 (+0.3%)
 Iranian: +20,845 (+0.3%)
 Canadian: +18,215 (−0.5%)
 Ukrainian: +13,985 (-)
Largest decreases:
 Jewish: −77,970 (−1.5%)
 English: −44,555 (−1.6%)
 Yugoslavian, n.o.s.: −1,900 (−0.4%)
 Scottish: −1,605 (−0.6%)
 French: −1,585 (−0.3%)

Cities 
Concentrations of ethnic groups per Toronto CMA municipality are as follows, with the largest proportion of each group in bold (only percentages higher than 5% are included):

Most common ethnic origins (only percentages higher than 7% are included) per Toronto CMA municipality are as follows, with the largest proportion of each ethnic origin in bold (as well the most populous ethnic group in a riding, if not English or Canadian) :

Ridings 
Visible minorities as percentage of population and top ethnic origins per riding, in the GTA outside the City of Toronto are as follows:

Future projections

Ethnic Groups

Black-Canadians

Cambodians

Chinese

Greeks

Italians

Japanese

South Asians

Vietnamese

Religion

Roman Catholics accounted for 33.4% of the population of the city of Toronto in 2001, followed by Protestants with 21.2%. Members of Christian Orthodox churches accounted for 4.9%, and other Christians (those not specifically identifying as Catholic, Protestant or Orthodox) formed 3.9%. The city's religious makeup also includes Islam with 5.5%, Hinduism (4.1%), Judaism (3.5%), Buddhism (2.1%), Sikhism (1%), and other communities; 16.6% reported no religious affiliation.

In particular, the 2001 Census data showed the following data per pre-amalgamation municipality:
 Toronto (667,320) : Catholic 31.1%, No religious affiliation 26.2%, Protestant 20.8%, Jewish 5.0%, Muslim 4.0%, Christian Orthodox 3.7%, Buddhist 3.4%
 North York (603,060) : Catholic 30.2%, Protestant 18.0%, No religious affiliation 15.8%, Jewish 10.1%, Muslim 7.8%, Christian Orthodox 5.2%, Christian, not included elsewhere 4.6%, Hindu 4.1%
 Scarborough (588,675) : Catholic 26.2%, Protestant 22.8%, No religious affiliation 19.7%, Hindu 9.7%, Muslim 7.8%, Christian Orthodox 5.1%, Christian, not included elsewhere 4.7%,
 Etobicoke (334,570) : Catholic 39.6%, Protestant 24.6%, No religious affiliation 11.3%, Muslim 6.9%, Hindu 4.9%, Christian Orthodox 4.3%, Christian, not included elsewhere 3.5%, Sikh 3.3%
 York (148,940) : Catholic 45.6%, Protestant 18.8%, No religious affiliation 12.8%, Muslim 5.0%, Christian, not included elsewhere 4.4%, Christian Orthodox 3.9%, Jewish 3.7%
 East York (114,245) : Protestant 25.3%, Catholic 23.6%, No religious affiliation 17.1%, Muslim 12.5%, Christian Orthodox 12.0%, Hindu 3.7%

The 2011 National Household Survey found that Roman Catholics accounted for 28.2% of the population in the city of Toronto in 2011, followed by those of no religious affiliation at 24.1%, "Other Christian" at 9.7%, and Muslims at 8.2%. Besides those registered in the "other Christian" category there were other Christian denominations who were also registered in the census, including Anglicans (3.8%), Baptists (1.4%), Christian Orthodox (4.3%), Lutheran (0.6%), Pentecostal (1.6%), Presbyterian (1.5%), and United Church (3%). Buddhists (2.7%), Hindu (5.6%), Judaism(3.8%), Sikh (0.8%), Aboriginal spirituality (0.03%) and "Other religions" (0.5%) were also included.

Ethno-religious groups

Languages

Mother tongue by population

City of Toronto

The finest granularity of mother tongue and language spoken in Toronto yet provided by the 2011 Census is that of the federal electoral district (riding; 2003 redistribution). Census tracts (and hence ward and neighbourhood) data is not yet available. For each of the federal electoral districts in the City of Toronto, the top three (or more if having more than 3% of native speakers; single responses are used - it is indicated by way of using bold whether English is the mother tongue of more than 60% of the population or if another language exceeds 10% of native speakers) are as follows:

TORONTO & EAST YORK
 Trinity-Spadina (137,865): 1. English (60.2%), 2. Cantonese (4.7%), 3. Portuguese (4.5%), 4. Chinese, not otherwise specified (4.5%), 5. Mandarin (3.8%)
 Toronto Centre (123,430): 1. English (61.7%), 2. Spanish (2.5%), 3. Chinese, not otherwise specified (2.4%)
 St. Paul's (112,470): 1. English (69.4%), 2. Spanish (3.0%), 3. Tagalog (Pilipino, Filipino) (2.6%)
 Beaches-East York (103,625): 1. English (70.0%), 2. Bengali (3.7%), 3. Greek (2.0%)
 Parkdale-High Park (100,595) : 1. English (63.0%), 2. Polish (4.3%), 3. Spanish (2.3%)
 Toronto-Danforth (100,420): 1. English (63.7%), 2. Cantonese (5.8%), 3. Greek (5.0%), 4. Chinese, not otherwise specified (3.6%)
 Davenport (98,425): 1. English (47.5%), 2. Portuguese (21.4%), 3. Italian (5.9%), 4. Spanish (5.6%)

NORTH YORK
 Willowdale (135,455): 1. English (35.1%), 2. Chinese, not otherwise specified (9.4%), 3. Persian (9.3%), 4. Korean (7.9%), 5. Mandarin (7.7%)
 Don Valley West (118,545): 1. English (54.4%), 2. Urdu (5.9%), 3. Persian (4.0%)
 York Centre (112,950): 1. English (40.5%), 2. Russian (11.9%), 3. Italian (7.6%), 4. Tagalog (Pilipino, Filipino) (7.4%) 5. Spanish (5.0%)
 Eglinton-Lawrence (108,730): 1. English (63.1%), 2. Tagalog (Pilipino, Filipino) (5.3%), 3. Italian (4.9%)
 Don Valley East  (106,115): 1. English (42.1%), 2. Mandarin (6.5%), 3. Chinese, not otherwise specified (6.1%) 4. Persian (4.6%), 5. Arabic (3.5%), 6. Tagalog (Pilipino, Filipino) (3.2%), 7. Cantonese (3.2%)
 York West (103,395): 1. English (44.0%), 2. Italian (9.6%), 3. Spanish (8.5%), 4. Vietnamese (5.3%), 5. Urdu (3.0%)

SCARBOROUGH
 Scarborough-Rouge River (128,905): 1. English (37.4%), 2. Tamil (13.8%), 3. Cantonese (13.1%), 4. Mandarin (4.6%), 5. Tagalog (Pilipino, Filipino) (4.3%), 6. Urdu (3.2%)
 Scarborough-Agincourt (107,465): 1. English (30.2%), 2. Chinese, not otherwise specified (15.8%), 3. Cantonese (14.4%), 4. Mandarin (12.0%), 5. Tamil (5.0%)
 Scarborough-Guildwood (105,900): 1. English (57.6%), 2. Tamil (8.0%), 3. Gujarati (6.0%), 4 Tagalog (Pilipino, Filipino) (3.9%), 5. Urdu (3.2%)
 Scarborough Centre (105,880): 1. English (47.7%), 2. Tamil (8.5%), 3. Tagalog (Pilipino, Filipino) (6.1%) 4. Chinese, not otherwise specified (3.8%), 5. Cantonese (3.5%)
 Scarborough Southwest (103,270): 1. English (59.3%), 2. Bengali (6.1%), 3. Tagalog (Pilipino, Filipino) (5.0%), 4. Tamil (3.4%)

ETOBICOKE YORK
 Etobicoke-Lakeshore (119,120): 1. English (59.7%), 2. Polish (5.6%), 3. Ukrainian (3.5%)
 York South-Weston (111,710): 1. English (49.9%), 2. Portuguese (9.0%), 3. Spanish (8.2%), 4. Italian (7.6%), 5. Vietnamese (3.6%)
 Etobicoke Centre (109,250): 1. English (54.1%), 2. Italian (5.5%), 3. Ukrainian (4.1%), 4. Spanish (3.2%)
 Etobicoke North (105,620): 1. English (45.4%), 2. Panjabi (Punjabi) (10.1%), 3. Gujarati (4.8%), 4. Italian (3.8%), 5. Urdu (3.1%), 6. Somali (3.0%)

Toronto CMA

Following are the corresponding data for the GTA ridings neighbouring the City of Toronto:

IN YORK REGION
 Oak Ridges-Markham (220,005): 1. English (52.2%), 2. Cantonese (10.9%), 3. Chinese, not otherwise specified (6.6%), 4. Italian (3.5%), 5. Mandarin (3.2%)
 Vaughan (187,340): 1. English (47.5%), 2. Italian (20.0%), 3. Spanish (3.1%)
 Thornhill (136,120): 1. English (47.6%), 2. Russian (10.9%), 3. Cantonese (4.5%), 4. Persian (4.1%) 5. Chinese, not otherwise specified (3.9%), 6. Korean (3.2%) 7. Hebrew (3.1%)
 Markham-Unionville (131,250): 1. English (34.2%), 2. Cantonese (18.1%), 3. Chinese, not otherwise specified (12.7%), 4. Tamil (7.5%), 5. Mandarin (6.0%), 6. Urdu (3.2%)
 Newmarket-Aurora (129,460): 1. English (77.4%), 2. Italian (2.1%), 3. Russian (1.7%)
 Richmond Hill (124,865): 1. English (40.4%), 2. Cantonese (10.1%), 3. Persian (9.2%), 4. Russian (7.8%), 5. Mandarin (5.7%), 6. Italian (5.7%), 7. Korean (3.4%)

IN PEEL REGION
 Bramalea-Gore-Malton (182,545): 1. English (49.3%), 2. Panjabi (Punjabi) (22.2%), 3. Urdu (3.0%)
 Mississauga-Brampton South (138,495): 1. English (41.6%), 2. Panjabi (Punjabi) (8.0%), 3. Urdu (5.2%), 4. Polish (3.8%), 5. Tagalog (Pilipino, Filipino) (3.5%)
 Mississauga East-Cooksville (131,915): 1. English (40.0%), 2. Polish (6.7%), 3. Urdu (5.0%), 4. Arabic (4.8%), 5. Tagalog (Pilipino, Filipino) (4.1%), 6. Spanish (3.2%)
 Mississauga South (108,685): 1. English (66.0%), 2. Polish (4.9%), 3. Portuguese (2.4%)

IN DURHAM REGION
 Ajax-Pickering (133,135): 1. English (78.2%), 2. Urdu (2.3%), 3. Tagalog (Pilipino, Filipino) (2.1%)
 Pickering-Scarborough East (104,495): 1. English (76.6%), 2. Tamil (2.4%), 3. Tagalog (Pilipino, Filipino) (2.4%)

Immigration patterns
According to the Canadian government, Toronto has one of the highest per capita immigration rate in the world. Within Canada itself, 43% of all new immigrants to Canada settle in the Greater Toronto Area adding significantly to Toronto's population. According to the 2006 Census, 45.7% of the residents of Toronto were immigrants. For the City of Toronto, the corresponding figure stood at 50.0%

The 2006 Census data  show the following temporal patterns in the sources of immigration to Toronto (and retention of immigrants per source country):
 Recent immigrants (2001–2006, 447,930): India 17.4%, China 14.3%, Pakistan 8.3%, Philippines 7.4%, Sri Lanka 3.9%, Iran 3.2%
 Period of immigration: 1996–2000 (362,320): India 13.5%, China 13.1%, Pakistan 7.8%, Philippines 5.9%, Sri Lanka 5.2%, Hong Kong 4.3%, Iran 3.4%, Russia 3.2%
 Period of immigration: 1991-1995 (357,865): Hong Kong 9.1%, India 8.7%, Philippines 8.7%, Sri Lanka 8.3%, China 8.1%, Poland 4.5%, Jamaica 4.1%, Guyana 3.5%, Vietnam 3.3%
 Period of immigration: Before 1991 (1,152,050): Italy 11.1%, United Kingdom 9.7%, Portugal 5.9%, India 5.6%, Jamaica 5.5%, Hong Kong 4.5%, China 4.4%, Philippines 3.9%, Poland 3.8%, Guyana 3.8%, Vietnam 3.4%

The percentage and breakdown of immigrants per place of birth for each City of Toronto Community Council is as follows:
 Toronto & East York (642,940): 39.0% (Eastern Asia 6.7%; Southern Europe 6.5%; Southeast Asia 4.1%; Southern Asia 3.7%; Eastern Europe 3.3%; Northern Europe 3.2%)
 North York (635,265): 54.4% (Eastern Asia 11.3%; Eastern Europe 6.5%; West Central Asia & Middle East 6.1%; Southern Europe 6.0%; Southeast Asia 5.5%; Southern Asia 5.5%)
 Scarborough (602,610): 57.4% (Eastern Asia 14.3%; Southern Asia 13.9%; Southeast Asia 6.6%; Caribbean & Bermuda 5.1%; South America 3.4%; Southern Europe 3.2%)
 Etobicoke York (595,370): 49.6% (Southern Europe 11.4%; Southern Asia 7.0%; Eastern Europe 5.8%; Caribbean & Bermuda 4.6%; Southeast Asia 4.2%; South America 4.1%)

The City of Toronto ward with the highest percentage of total immigrants is Ward 41 Scarborough-Rouge River where 71.4% of the total population are immigrants (Eastern Asia 41.4%, Southern Asia 10.7%, Southeast Asia 6.0%, Caribbean & Bermuda 3.8%). At the other end of the spectrum is Ward 16 Eglinton-Lawrence having the lowest percentage of immigrants, 24.7% in particular (Eastern Europe 4.1%, Northern Europe 3.4%, Southern Europe 3.3%).

Highs and lows (2011 Census)

Wards
 Largest area (hectares): Ward 42 - Scarborough-Rouge River: 3,928
 Smallest area (hectares): Ward 18 - Davenport: 474
 Most populous: Ward 23 - Willowdale: 79,435
 Least populous: Ward 19 - Toronto-Danforth: 44,420
 Highest % recent immigrants: Ward 33 - Don Valley East: 24.1%
 Lowest % recent immigrants: Ward 16 - Eglinton Lawrence: 3.7%
 Highest % visible minorities: Ward 42 - Scarborough-Rouge River: 88.7%
 Lowest % visible minorities: Ward 16 - Eglinton Lawrence: 12.6%
 Highest median household income: Ward 25 - Don Valley West: $86,901
 Lowest median household income: Ward 14 - Parkdale-High Park: $38,352

Ethnocultural

Mother tongue
(highest %)
 English: Ward 32 - Beaches-East York: 77.7%  (Lowest %: Ward 39 - Scarborough-Agincourt: 24.9%)
 Portuguese: Ward 18 - Davenport: 25.3%
 Cantonese: Ward 41 - Scarborough-Rouge River: 23.5%
 Chinese, not otherwise specified: Ward 39 - Scarborough-Agincourt: 22.2%
 Italian: Ward 9 - York Centre: 20.4%
 Russian: Ward 10 - York Centre: 19.5%
 Tamil: Ward 42 - Scarborough-Rouge River: 15.1%
 Panjabi (Punjabi): Ward 1 - Etobicoke North: 13.3%
 Urdu: Ward 26 - Don Valley West: 11.2%
 Greek: Ward 29 - Toronto-Danforth: 10.7%

Home language
(highest %)
 English: Ward 16 - Eglinton-Lawrence: 89.9% (Lowest %: Ward 39 - Scarborough-Agincourt: 36.1%)
 Cantonese: Ward 41 - Scarborough-Rouge River: 22.5%
 Chinese, not otherwise specified: Ward 39 - Scarborough-Agincourt: 18.3%
 Portuguese: Ward 18 - Davenport: 17.8%
 Russian: Ward 10 - York Centre: 17.6%
 Italian: Ward 9 - York Centre: 12.7%
 Tamil: Ward 42 - Scarborough-Rouge River: 12.7%
 Panjabi (Punjabi): Ward 1 - Etobicoke North: 11.0%

Ethnic origin
(highest %; single responses)
 Chinese: Ward 41 - Scarborough-Rouge River: 56.1%
 Portuguese: Ward 17 - Davenport: 28.0%
 Italian: Ward 9 - York Centre: 27.2%
 East Indian: Ward 1 - Etobicoke North: 26.0%
 Jewish: Ward 10 - York Centre: 17.3%
 Greek: Ward 29 - Toronto-Danforth: 13.0%

Visible minority
(highest %)
 Not a visible minority: Ward 16 - Eglinton-Lawrence: 87.4%
 Chinese: Ward 41 - Scarborough-Rouge River: 57.3%
 South Asian: Ward 1 - Etobicoke North: 37.9%
 Black: Ward 8 - York West: 21.8%
 Filipino: Ward 25 - Scarborough Southwest: 10.4%
 Latin American: Ward 7 - York West: 9.6%
 Korean: Ward 23 - Willowdale: 9.4%
 Southeast Asian: Ward 8 - York West: 7.2%
 West Asian: Ward 23 - Willowdale: 6.9%
 Arab: Ward 34 - Don Valley East: 3.0%
 Japanese: Ward 27 - Toronto Centre-Rosedale: 1.2%

Education
(highest %)
 Earned doctorate: Ward 20 - Trinity-Spadina: 3.3%
 Master's degree: Ward 27 - Toronto Centre-Rosedale: 13.0%
 Degree in medicine, dentistry, veterinary medicine:  Ward 25 - Don Valley West: 3.5%
 University certificate above bachelor level: Ward 22 - St. Paul's: 5.5%
 Bachelor's degree: Ward 22 - St. Paul's: 31.5%
 University certificate or degree: Ward 22 - St. Paul's: 54.1%

References

External links

Human Development Report 2004 - Ch. 5, page 99

Toronto
Toronto